The Universiti Malaysia Terengganu (University of Malaysia, Terengganu) or UMT, formerly known as Kolej Universiti Sains dan Teknologi Malaysia (Malaysian University College of Science and Technology) or KUSTEM, is a university in Kuala Nerus District, Terengganu, Malaysia. It was officially chartered on 1 February 2007.

History of Universiti Malaysia Terengganu (UMT)

Universiti Malaysia Terengganu began as Universiti Pertanian Malaysia's Centre for Fisheries and Marine Science, located at Mengabang Telipot, Kuala Terengganu. It provided facilities for both students and lecturers from the Fisheries and Marine Science programmes to conduct their practical sessions and also researches.

Eventually, the Faculty of Fisheries and Marine Science of Universiti Pertanian Malaysia (UPM) in Serdang was transferred to Kuala Terengganu, and the Centre transformed into a branch campus, being renamed Universiti Pertanian Malaysia Terengganu (UPMT) in June 1996. The name of the faculty was also changed to the Faculty of Applied Sciences and Technology. Also formed were the Faculty of Science and Professional Literature and the Matriculation Centre.

Later on, the Cabinet of Malaysia had approved the establishment of Terengganu University College (KUT) on 5 May 1999 as an associate campus of UPM. Then Terengganu Universiti College was given autonomy on 1 May 2001 and was renamed Kolej Universiti Sains dan Teknologi Malaysia (KUSTEM) on 20 June 2001.

On 1 February 2007, KUSTEM was given the status of a full-fledged university, and with that elevation, it was renamed again and remain to this very day as Universiti Malaysia Terengganu. At the same time, KUSTEM's emblem was rehashed as the University's emblem.

Vision, Mission, Function & Objective

PHILOSOPHY
 The Integration of Knowledge and Practice based on the Faith in Allah is Fundamental to the University's Endeavour in Preparing Competent Human Capital for Global Prosperity

VISION
 Becoming The Country's Leading and Globally Respected Marine-Focused University

MISSION
 Generating Knowledge for the Community's Affluence and Environmental Sustainability.

SLOGAN
 Ocean of Discoveries, for Global Sustainability

NICHE AREA
 Marine Science and Aquatic Resources

FUNCTIONS
 Supports the mission of the university to become the premier centre of learning and research by contributing to the progress of humankind and exploration of knowledge and also to the creation of wealth and national development.
 Provides trained manpower with professional skills, high self-discipline and positive work ethics.
 Produces graduates who are sensitive to management ideas, responsive to change and become a role-model for students and community.
 Serves society through the dissemination of ideas and new practices and seek solutions to current problems in society.
 Establishes relationships with other universities, institutions and the industry for mutual benefit and the national development.
 Supports the mission of the university to become an organised centre of research and learning as well as providing good services and exploring in a new technologies.

OBJECTIVES
 Explores all areas related to Science, Technology and Natural Resource Management through research.
 Provides the latest facilities (laboratories, libraries, computing and environment) to support the development of knowledge, learning and scholarship.
 Offers excellent programmes of study that meet current and future needs. Produces graduates who are responsible, knowledgeable, confident and competent.
 Plays an active role in the development of social, economic and education through the expansion services specifically to the local community of the East Coast Peninsular and to the Malaysians, in general.

Undergraduate Programmes

Foundation		
 G0001	Foundation in STEM 
		
Diploma		
 G2051	Diploma in Fisheries
		
Bachelor (Pure Science)		
 GS02	Bachelor of Science (Biological Sciences)
 GS08	Bachelor of Science (Computational Mathematics)
 GS28	Bachelor of Science (Chemical Sciences)
 GS40	Bachelor of Science (Marine Biology)
 GS43	Bachelor of Science (Financial Mathematics)
 GS44	Bachelor of Science (Analytical and Environmental Chemistry)
		
Bachelor (Applied Science)		
 GC10	Bachelor of Computer Science (Software Engineering)
 GC28	Bachelor of Computer Science with Maritime Informatics
 GG09	Bachelor of Food Science (Food Service and Nutrition)
 GG10	Bachelor of Applied Science (Fisheries)
 GG15	Bachelor of Science (Marine Science)
 GG27	Bachelor of Science in Agrotechnology (Aquaculture)
 GG34	Bachelor of Science in Agrotechnology (Crop Science)
 GG31	Bachelor of Science in Agrotechnology (Post Harvest Technology)
 GG37	Bachelor of Applied Science (Maritime Technology)
 GS03	Bachelor of Applied Science (Biodiversity Conservation and Management)
 GS04	Bachelor of Food Science (Food Technology)
 GS15	Bachelor of Applied Science (Electronic Physics and Instrumentation)
 GS68	Bachelor of Science (Nautical Sciences and Maritime Transport)
 GY06	Bachelor of Technology (Environment)
		
Bachelor (Social Science)		
 GE00	Bachelor of Economics (Natural Resources)
 GE02	Bachelor of Accounting
 GP04	Bachelor of Counseling
 GP08	Bachelor of Management (Tourism)
 GP18	Bachelor of Management (Maritime)
 GP22	Bachelor of Management (Marketing)
 GP31	Bachelor of Management (Policy and Social Environment)

Chancellor

 Her Royal Highness Sultanah Nur Zahirah, (Sultanah of Terengganu and 13th Raja Permaisuri Agong, 2006-2011), D.K., D.M.N., S.S.M.Z., S.S.M.T., D.K. (Kedah), Knight Grand Cross (First Class) of the Most Illustrious Order of Chula Chom Klao (Thailand)

Rankings

See also
 List of universities in Malaysia

Sources

Universities and colleges in Terengganu
Universiti Malaysia Terengganu
Educational institutions established in 1979
1979 establishments in Malaysia